Childcraft is a multi-volume illustrated anthology for children, which originated in 1934.

Origin and description

The Childcraft series was originally created in 1934 by W. F. Quarrie & Company, then publishers of the World Book encyclopedia. The series' title was Childcraft – The How and Why Library.

Childcraft was created as a sort of encyclopedia for young children. With simple texts and illustrations, the volumes were designed to make learning fun. Each volume addressed different subjects, including literature — such as short stories and poetry, including fairy tales and nursery rhymes — as well as mathematics and the sciences.

Starting out as seven volumes in the late 1930s, the series was re-issued in a new edition every few years, sometimes incorporating new volumes and re-arranging existing ones. It grew to 15 volumes in the 1950s, and remained there, though further changes were made in later editions.

The Childcraft set also added a separate, optional, special annual volume each year, starting in 1965. Some of these were later incorporated as regular volumes.

In addition, by the 1980s the series had broadened its reach to a dozen foreign language editions, with editions shipped to over 50 countries around the world.

Contents

The 15 volumes of Childcraft, published by World Book, Inc., currently consist of:

Once Upon a Time- short stories and folk tales.
Art Around Us
Poems and Rhymes - poetry
How Things Work
How Does it Happen?
Our Earth
Our Universe
Shapes and Numbers
The World of Animals
The World of Plants
About You
Celebrate!
See The World
Who We Are
Guide to Childcraft

The 1982 -1995 edition consists of the following: 
Once Upon a Time
Time to Read
Stories and Poems
World and Space
About Animals
The Green Kingdom
How Things Work (1982-1990) or Story of the Sea (1991-1995)
About Us
Holidays and Birthdays
Places to Know
Make and Do
Look and Learn (1982-1990) or How Things Work (1991-1995)
Mathemagic
About Me
Guide for Parents (1982-1990) or Guide to Childcraft (1991-1995)

The 1973-1982 edition consisted of the following:

 Poems and Rhymes
 Stories and Fables
 Children Everywhere
 World and Space
 About Animals
 How Things Work
 How We Get Things
 What People Do
 Holidays and Customs
 Places to Know
 Make and Do
 Look and Learn
 Look Again
 About Me
 Guide for Parents

The 1954 edition consisted of the following:

 Poems of Early Childhood
 Storytelling and Other Poems
 Folk and Fairy Tales
 Animal Friends and Adventures
 Life in Many Lands
 Great Men and Famous Deeds
 Exploring the World Around Us
 Creative Play and Hobbies
 Science and Industry
 Art for Children
 Music for the Family
 You and Your Family
 Your Young Child
 Your Child Goes to School
 Your Child in Today's World

The following "Childcraft Annual" volumes were released.

1965. Places to Know
1966. Look and Learn
1967. Braving the Elements
1968. Look Again
1969. About Me
1970. Children Everywhere
1971. About Animals
1972. The Green Kingdom
1973. About Us
1974. Animals in Danger
1975. The Magic of Words
1976. Prehistoric Animals
1977. About Dogs
1978. Mathemagic
1979. Story of the Sea
1980. The Indian Book
1981. The Bug Book
1982. The Puzzle Book
1983. Feathered Friends
1984. Great Myths and Legends
1985. Conquest of the Sky
1986. Mysteries and Fantasies
1987. Dinosaurs
1988. Stories of Freedom
1989. World of Color/People to Know
1990. A Place to Live/How We Get Things
1991. I Was Wondering
1992. Pets and Other Animals
1993. Inventors and Inventions
1994. A Look Into Space
1995. Our Amazing Bodies
1996. Exploring the Ocean
1997. Science, Science Everywhere
1998. Friends in the Wild
1999. The Fact Factory
2000. World Adventure
2001. Stories to Share
2002. Secrets of the Past
2003. Heroes and Helpers
2004. Native North Americans
2005. All About Birds
2006. Tales of Mystery and the Unknown
2007. Insects, Spiders, and Creepy Crawlers
2008. Dogs, from Woofs to Wags
2009. Tales Through Time
2010. Brain Games
2011. Code Red: Animals in Peril
2012. Letters to Words
2013. A Dream Takes Flight
2014. The Secret Files of Professor L. Otto Funn
2015. Dr. Mollie Cule Reboots the Robot
2016. Dinosaurs Great & Small
2017. MFF (Math Friends Forever)
2018. Monster All Around
2019. Where in the World Can I…

Footnotes

See also

World Book Encyclopedia

References
World Book, Inc. Answers.com. International Directory of Company Histories, The Gale Group, Inc., 2006

External links
Childcraft – The How & Why Library Official site

Children's non-fiction books
Children's encyclopedias